Eva Therése Sjölander (born 4 May 1981 in Sollefteå, Sweden) is an ice hockey player from Sweden. She won a silver medal at the 2006 Winter Olympics and a bronze medal at the 2002 Winter Olympics.

References

External links
Sweden thrashes Italy in Olympic ice hockey, Feb. 13, 2008.

1981 births
Living people
Ice hockey players at the 2002 Winter Olympics
Ice hockey players at the 2006 Winter Olympics
Medalists at the 2002 Winter Olympics
Medalists at the 2006 Winter Olympics
Olympic bronze medalists for Sweden
Olympic ice hockey players of Sweden
Olympic medalists in ice hockey
Olympic silver medalists for Sweden
People from Sollefteå Municipality
Swedish women's ice hockey players
Ice hockey players at the 1998 Winter Olympics
Sportspeople from Västernorrland County